Hellraiser: Hellseeker (also known as Hellraiser VI: Hellseeker) is a 2002 supernatural horror film directed by Rick Bota and written by Carl V. Dupré and Tim Day. The sixth film in the Hellraiser series, it features the return of Kirsty Cotton, the heroine from Hellraiser and its sequel. Also, while not officially part of the production team, Clive Barker had cursory input on the film and some uncredited influence on the third act, specifically. Hellseeker was the last Hellraiser film to have any involvement from Barker, uncredited or otherwise.

The film was made in 2001 in Vancouver, British Columbia and released straight to video in the United States on October 15, 2002.

Plot
Trevor Gooden (Dean Winters) survives a car accident that apparently killed his wife Kirsty Cotton-Gooden (Ashley Laurence) when their car plunged off a bridge into the river below. Trevor manages to escape with his life, but even though police divers find both car doors open there is no sign of Kirsty.

One month later, Trevor wakes up in a hospital and realizes that his wife is missing, but because of a head injury his memory is uncertain and he cannot distinguish between fantasy and reality. Trevor finds himself the prime suspect in a murder case, and has numerous encounters with homicide detectives Givens and Lange, though the two detectives never appear to be together at the same place. Many strange events befall him, including experiencing various hallucinations and several important events turning out to be just figments of Trevor's imagination. Trevor also witnesses his friend Dean (Trevor White) commit suicide.
 
Eventually, Trevor is summoned to the police station and taken to the basement by Detective Lange in order to identify a body. There it is revealed that Givens and Lange are actually a single monstrous creature with 2 different heads. Trevor runs away from them and enters a morgue. Just as he is about to uncover a dead body on an operating table, the Cenobite Pinhead (Doug Bradley) appears and reveals the truth to Trevor. In reality, Kirsty is in fact still alive. Trevor cheated on his wife with many other women and tried to get rid of Kirsty by making her reopen the Lament Configuration. She did, but before being taken away forever she made one last deal with Pinhead: she offered to give him five souls in exchange for hers. She killed three of Trevor's mistresses and his friend Bret, who was conspiring to kill her for her fortune.

Trevor is in shock by the revelation and takes the covers off the body on the operating table, believing it to be Kirsty. The person on the table is not Kirsty, but is in fact him. He is the fifth soul and this entire time he has been in Hell living in limbo. Trying to rediscover his past and piece his life back together was his punishment for his disloyalty to his wife and his inability to accept who he truly was. It seems that she has pinned all of the murders on Trevor and shot Trevor through the head while he was driving, leading him to crash the car into the river and making his death appear as a suicide. The film ends with Kirsty walking away from the car crash scene with the Lament Configuration in her hand.

Cast
 Ashley Laurence as Kirsty Cotton-Gooden
 Doug Bradley as Pinhead / Merchant (as Charles Stead)
 Dean Winters as Trevor Gooden
 William S. Taylor as Det. Mike Lange
 Michael Rogers as Detective Givens
 Rachel Hayward as Dr. Allison Dormer
 Trevor White as Bret
 Sarah-Jane Redmond as Gwen Stevens
 Jody Thompson as Tawny
 Kaaren de Zilva as Sage
 Dale Wilson as Chief Surgeon / Surgeon Cenobite
 Ken Camroux as Dr. Ambrose
 Brenda McDonald as Angular Nurse

Production 
Writer Michael Lent gained attention for a spec script he had written and was invited by the Weinstein brothers to pitch on the fifth installment of the Hellraiser franchise. Lent's story "The Hellseeker" began with a fire at a remote radio station turned hacker laboratory. There is at least one survivor, a severely burned John Doe, later named Miller Rix. A game designer named Blink is also missing. Rix does not remember who he is, as he slowly recovers from his injuries. A fragment of a Cenobite claw embedded in his body, causes him to be haunted by horrific images as his memories are gradually restored. Rix hunts for his own identity, pursued by the police and the Cenobites, he has a chance to be new person or be caught by his past and the literal demons who seek to claim him. Blink returns and tells Miller about the Hellraiser game they had hacked into and his plan to release it globally. The script went through many drafts and Doug Aarniokoski was brought on as director, but he left to direct Highlander: Endgame. Several executives connected to the project at Miramax/Dimension had been fired, and the project was pushed back from fifth to potentially the sixth Hellraiser film. Lent completed his obligations, and offered to work something out if further drafts were needed but the project went silent. The next thing Lent heard about it was that a film titled "Hellseeker" was filming in Canada. Although the two projects had some similarities the film that was eventually produced was very different from what Lent had written, "everything that happens after the first eight or ten minutes was not anything that I would have ever envisioned".

After the relative success of Hellraiser: Inferno in 2000, Dimension Films hired Carl V. Dupre and Tim Day to write a sequel, and Rick Bota direct. At Bota's suggestion, the script was rewritten to include the first film's protagonist Kirsty Cotton, who had been absent from the series since a cameo appearance in the third film. Although it initially appeared Ashley Laurence would not be able to reprise the role, Doug Bradley informed her of the film and she agreed to return. After filming completed Bota decided against the wishes of the studio to screen a workprint of the film for Clive Barker, who provided notes and suggestions for the film's third act. The film's original climax, written by Bradley, was ultimately edited out of the film.

Release

Home media
The film was released on VHS and DVD on October 15, 2002 by Buena Vista Home Entertainment. The film debuted on the Blu-ray format for the first time on July 17, 2012 by Echo Bridge Entertainment.

Critical reception
Based on 8 reviews, the film received a 0% on Rotten Tomatoes with an average rating of 3.6 out of 10.

Richard Scheib of Moria called the movie "quite an oddity". He stated that "Hellseeker would have worked much more effectively if it were not a Hellraiser film, one suspects" and rated it two and a half stars out of five.

Scot Weinberg of eFilmCritic stated in the film's review: "Though a marked improvement over its two immediate forefathers, Hellseeker suffers from the same maladies as the cheapies that came before: muddled storytelling, turgid pacing, unconvincing acting performances, and an overall sense of filmmakers simply not trying all that hard". He described the film's finale as being "culled directly from cult-fave Jacob's Ladder" and rated the movie one star out of five. FilmThreat said it "rarely does it cross the mediocrity line from TV movie to feature film" and "all the cutbacks prove to make "H6" neither interesting nor involving".

According to writer Tim Day, Clive Barker enjoyed an early version of the film, calling it his favorite in the series since Hellbound: Hellraiser II.

Sequel

References

External links

 
  
 

2002 direct-to-video films
2002 horror films
2002 films
American supernatural horror films
American direct-to-video films
Canadian supernatural horror films
English-language Canadian films
Direct-to-video horror films
Films based on works by Clive Barker
Hellraiser films
Religious horror films
Direct-to-video interquel films
Films shot in Vancouver
Miramax films
Dimension Films films
Canadian direct-to-video films
2000s English-language films
2000s American films
2000s Canadian films
2000s British films